Flying Regiment 4 ( or LeR 4) was a bomber aircraft regiment of the Finnish Air Force. The regiment was formed on 1 January 1938 and was active during the Winter War, the Continuation War, and the Lapland War. During the Winter War, the unit flew 423 war missions, of which 22 were strategic and photo reconnaissance flights with its Bristol Blenheim Mk.Is. 18 aircraft and 21 crew members were lost.

During the Continuation War the regiment was re-equipped with new Bristol Blenheims Mk.IVs, German Dornier Do 17Zs, Junkers Ju 88s, and Russian Ilyushin DB-3s, and Tupolev SBs. The unit could now mount some 50 aircraft in their largest raids. More than 4,000 missions were flown during the Continuation War. 65 aircraft and 165 crew members were lost.

During the Lapland War LeR 4 flew 462 missions against the Germans, losing 7 aircraft and 16 crew members.

Organization

Winter War
No. 42 Squadron: bomber squadron
No. 44 Squadron: bomber squadron
No. 46 Squadron: bomber squadron

Continuation War
No. 42 Squadron: bomber squadron
No. 44 Squadron: bomber squadron
No. 46 Squadron: bomber squadron
No. 48 Squadron: bomber squadron

Lapland War
No. 42 Squadron: bomber squadron
No. 44 Squadron: bomber squadron
No. 46 Squadron: bomber squadron
No. 48 Squadron: bomber squadron

After World War II, the regiment and its squadrons were re-organized and the new squadrons were renamed No. 41, No. 43, and No. 45 Squadrons.

Aircraft
Junkers Ju 88 A-4
Dornier Do 17
Bristol Blenheim I
Bristol Blenheim IV
Petlyakov Pe-2
Ilyushin DB-3M
Ilyushin Il-4
Avro Anson

Sources
Keskinen, Kalevi and Stenman, Kari: Finnish Air Force 1939-1945, Squadron/Signal publications, Carrollton, Texas, 1998, 

Military units and formations of Finland in the Winter War
Continuation War
Regiments of the Finnish Air Force